Dial-A-Song: 20 Years Of They Might Be Giants is a 2002 compilation album by American alternative rock band They Might Be Giants, issued by Rhino Records and compiled by the band's co-singer/songwriter and guitarist John Flansburgh. Despite its name, the compilation does not include tracks from the band's "Dial-A-Song" service. It is instead an anthology of various single, album and live tracks from the band's history, spanning their full career up to the time of its release. It includes tracks from every album starting with 1986's They Might Be Giants up through No!, their first children's album, which was released only three months before this compilation.

The first disc focuses mainly on the group's singles and better-known album tracks, while disc two delves into more obscure fan favorites and live cuts.

Song notes
"Older" is the original version featured on the album Long Tall Weekend and in the ABC mini-series Brave New World.
"Robot Parade" is the "Adult Version", with a more hard rock arrangement, as opposed to the version from the children's album No!
 "Boss of Me" is best known as the theme song to the TV series Malcolm in the Middle, although the version here is the full single version, not the shortened version used on the show.
 "Istanbul (Not Constantinople)" is a cover song, originally performed by The Four Lads.
 "The Guitar" is a semi-remake of The Tokens' "The Lion Sleeps Tonight".
 "New York City" is a cover, originally performed by Cub.
 "Cyclops Rock" is several seconds longer than the Mink Car album version and contains different guitar noises at the end.
 "Dr. Evil" appeared in the film Austin Powers: The Spy Who Shagged Me and on the film's second soundtrack album.
 "Why Does the Sun Shine (The Sun Is a Mass of Incandescent Gas) (live)" is the live version of the song from Severe Tire Damage and a cover, originally performed by Tom Glazer.
 "James K. Polk" is a new unreleased version, although it is not labeled as such. It seems to include the same instrumentation as the version from Factory Showroom, but with different vocals.
 "She's Actual Size (live)" is, along with "James K. Polk", the only other exclusive, unreleased song on the set.
 "Spy (Original Version)" is listed as an exclusive, unreleased live version, but is actually the version of the song from Why Does The Sun Shine? (The Sun Is a Mass of Incandescent Gas).
 "Stormy Pinkness (live in Berlin)" is also listed as an exclusive, but it was previously released through the TMBG Unlimited mp3 service.
 "Fingertips" on this album is one track, while the Apollo 18 album separated the song into 21 different tracks.
 This album contains the single remixes of both "Don't Let's Start" and "(She Was A) Hotel Detective".

Track listing
All songs by They Might Be Giants unless otherwise noted.

Personnel

Musicians 
John Flansburgh – guitar, keyboards, vocals, compilation
John Linnell – accordion, keyboards, saxophone, vocals, compilation
Dan Miller – guitar, synth guitar
Danny Weinkauf – bass
Dan Hickey – drums
Zachary Alford – drums
Amy Allison – vocals
Alan Bezozi – tambourine, drums (snare)
Steve Calhoon – drums
Laura Cantrell – vocals
Ron Caswell – tuba
Hal Cragin – bass
Mark Feldman – violin
Robin Goldwasser – vocals
Sue Hadjopoulas – percussion, conga
Nicholas Hill – vocals
Kurt Hoffman – horn, horn arrangements, string arrangements
Luís Jardim – percussion
Gregor Kitzis – violin
Julian Koster – singing saw
Ron Lawrence – viola
Dan Levine – trombone
Frank London – trumpet
Tony Maimone – bass
Elma Mayer – vocals
Tim Newman – trombone
Jim O'Connor – trumpet
Mark Pender – trumpet
Mauro Refosco – percussion
Erik Sanko – bass
Eric Schermerhorn – acoustic guitar, guitar
Adam Schlesinger – keyboards, programming, producer
Peter Stampfel – banjo, vocals
Krystof Witek – violin
Lyle Workman – guitar
Garo Yellin – cello

Production Crew 
Danny Alonso – engineer
Susan Anderson – photography
Paul Angelli – engineer, mixing
Ben Bailes – engineer
Mark Bishop – engineer
Albert Caiati – engineer
Bruce Calder – assistant
Bob Clearmountain – mixing
Paula Court – photography
Reuben Cox – photography
Peter Dilg – producer
Patrick Dillett – producer, engineer, mixing
TJ Doherty – engineer
Edward Douglas – engineer
Tom Durack – producer, mixing
Sheryl Farber – editorial supervision
Alan Ford – engineer
Paul Fox – producer
Cheryl Fugate – project assistant
Tony Gillis – engineer
Barbara Glauber – design
Matt Gold – engineer
Michael Halsband – photography
Cosmo Heidtman – engineer
Dan Hersch – remastering
Al Houghton – engineer
Jim Hughes – compilation
Bill Inglot – remastering
Hiro Ishihara – engineer
Beverly Joel – design
Julie Kantner – photography
Bill Krauss – producer, engineer
Chris Laidlaw – engineer
Rich Lamb – engineer
Clive Langer – producer
Mark Leviton – compilation
April Milek – project assistant
Katherine Miller – engineer
Roger Moutenot – engineer, mixing, whip
UE Nastasi – assistant
Alex Noyes – engineer
Alex Olsson – engineer
Randy Perry – project assistant
David Robbins – engineer
Marc Salata – product manager
Tim Scanlin – A&R
Brent Sigmeth – engineer
Brian Speiser – mixing
Jason Spittle – engineer
Mark Stern – photography
Ed Thacker – engineer, mixing
They Might Be Giants – producer
Greg Thompson – engineer
Sarah Vowell – liner notes
Jeff White – compilation
Alan Winstanley – producer, mixing
Jeremy Wolff – photography
Steve Woolard – discographical annotation
Toshikazu Yoshioka – engineer

References

External links
Dial-A-Song: 20 Years Of They Might Be Giants at This Might Be A Wiki

They Might Be Giants compilation albums
2002 compilation albums
Rhino Records compilation albums